Albert Garrette Burns (March 10, 1888 – December 4, 1951) was president of the National Inventors Congress starting in 1931 and served until at least 1939. He was known as the "Nation's Gadget Chief".

Biography
He was born in California on March 10, 1888, to William F. Burns and Louise C. Ball. He later invented a lock for Model T Fords. Other jobs included working in a tea and coffee store, directing a local chamber of commerce, running a wholesale business, as well as managing a sanitarium and a textile mill. He also invented and marketed a bread-slicer.

References

1888 births
1951 deaths
20th-century American inventors